The Community Access Program (CAP, also seen as C@P) was an initiative of the Government of Canada which aimed to provide Canadians with affordable public access to the Internet and the skills they need to use it effectively. The program was administered by Industry Canada.

History of CAP
In 1994 the Community Access Program began. Initially, Industry Canada focused on rural communities, where Internet access was less available. Once the rural communities were equipped with computers and Internet access, Industry Canada focused on what is referred to as the digital divide. According to Statistics Canada 2001, the following groups were in highest need of services offered by CAP: Aboriginals, older Canadians, Canadians with low income or low education, francophone, new immigrants, and people in rural areas. Therefore, the focus was primarily to assist in 'Bridging the Digital Divide'.

CAP Sites in rural and urban areas were then opened to help reach these people. The program played a crucial role in bridging the Digital Divide; contributing to the foundation for electronic access to government services; encouraging online learning and literacy; fostering the development of community based infrastructure; promoting Canadian e-commerce; and providing training with Assistive Technology. In order to make better use of the computers and equipment funded by CAP, Industry Canada also initiated the Community Access Program - Youth Initiative (CAP YI). CAP Sites could apply for funding to hire Youth Interns to come and work in their CAP Sites to train the public in computer and Internet use and technology.

The CAP program was terminated on March 31, 2012 as funding for the program was not renewed. Industry Canada stated that the program had reached its objective, and cited challenging fiscal times. Some provinces maintained their program thanks to large financial contributions from the provincial government, municipalities and libraries. The CAP YI (Youth Initiative) program continues to receive funding.

CAP YI
The Community Access Program (CAP) Youth Initiative (YI) was coordinated by Industry Canada's Community Access Program and funded through the Youth Employment Strategy (YES) of Canada -- overseen by Human Resources and Social Development Canada (HRSDC). CAP's youth initiative aimed to provide employment opportunities for young Canadians between the ages of 15 and 30 - primarily students, recent graduates, or the under-employed or unemployed.

Locations
Industry Canada's Community Access Program (CAP) gave thousands of Canadians affordable access to the Internet. CAP sites were located in public locations such as schools, community centers, and libraries. They provided access in locations that are geographically remote (e.g. on parts of Cape Breton Island) or served populations subject to the digital divide. Sites were established and maintained by community networks, generally in partnership with Municipal and Provincial Governments. There were CAP sites located in all of the provinces and territories of Canada.

Nova Scotia C@P
The Nova Scotia Community Access Program continued after the loss of federal funding in 2012, and continues to operate as @NS.

References

External links
 Official CAP Website
 Ontario CAP Website
 Newfoundland CAP Website
 Nova Scotia CAP Website
 Prince Edward Island CAP Website
 Manitoba CAP Website
 Saskatchewan CAP Website
 Alberta CAP Website
 British Columbia CAP Website
 Yukon CAP Website
 North West Territories CAP Website
 Nunavut CAP Website

Internet in Canada